Boguszyce may refer to the following places in Poland:
Boguszyce, Oleśnica County in Lower Silesian Voivodeship (south-west Poland)
Boguszyce, Strzelin County in Lower Silesian Voivodeship (south-west Poland)
Boguszyce, Podlaskie Voivodeship (north-east Poland)
Boguszyce, Łęczyca County in Łódź Voivodeship (central Poland)
Boguszyce, Rawa County in Łódź Voivodeship (central Poland)
Boguszyce, Greater Poland Voivodeship (west-central Poland)
Boguszyce, Silesian Voivodeship (south Poland)
Boguszyce, Opole Voivodeship (south-west Poland)
Boguszyce, Pomeranian Voivodeship (north Poland)
Boguszyce, Choszczno County in West Pomeranian Voivodeship (north-west Poland)
Boguszyce, Goleniów County in West Pomeranian Voivodeship (north-west Poland)
Boguszyce, Stargard County in West Pomeranian Voivodeship (north-west Poland)